John Holmes (21 March 1952 – 26 September 2009) was an English professional rugby league footballer. 

Holmes played in nineteen major finals for Leeds winning all but five. He played at the highest level, representing Yorkshire, England and Great Britain. He made 20 appearances between 1971 and 1982 for Great Britain, and was a World Cup winner for Great Britain in 1972 at the age of twenty.

Background
John Holmes was born in Kirkstall, Leeds, West Riding of Yorkshire, England, and he died aged 57 in Leeds, West Yorkshire, England.

Playing career

Leeds
Holmes début for Leeds was in a Lazenby Cup match against Hunslet where he scored a try and kicked 10 goals.

Holmes played in Leeds' 26–11 victory over St. Helens in the 1974–75 Rugby League Premiership Final during the 1974–75 season at Central Park, Wigan on Saturday 17 May 1975, but missed the 24–2 victory over Bradford Northern in the 1978–79 Rugby League Premiership Final during the 1978–79 season at Fartown Ground, Huddersfield on Saturday 27 May 1979 after being called up as a late replacement for the 1979 GB Lions Tour to Australasia.

Holmes played in Leeds' 7–24 defeat by Leigh in the 1970–71 Challenge Cup Final during the 1970–71 season at Wembley Stadium, London on Saturday 15 May 1971, in front of a crowd of 85,514, played  in the 13–16 defeat by St. Helens in the 1971–72 Challenge Cup Final during the 1971–72 season at Wembley Stadium, London on Saturday 13 May 1972, in front of a crowd of 89,495, played  in the 16–7 victory over Widnes in the 1976–77 Challenge Cup Final during the 1976–77 season at Wembley Stadium, London on Saturday 7 May 1977, in front of a crowd of 80,871, and played  in the 14–12 victory over St Helens in the 1977–78 Challenge Cup Final during the 1977–78 season at Wembley Stadium, London on Saturday 13 May 1978, in front of a crowd of 96,000.

John Holmes played  in Leeds' 23–7 victory over Featherstone Rovers in the 1970–71 Yorkshire Cup Final during the 1970–71 season at Odsal Stadium, Bradford on Saturday 21 November 1970, played , scored 3-tries, and was man of the match winning the White Rose Trophy in the 36–9 victory over Dewsbury in the 1972–73 Yorkshire Cup Final during the 1972–73 season at Odsal Stadium, Bradford on Saturday 7 October 1972, played  in the 7–2 victory over Wakefield Trinity in the 1973–74 Yorkshire Cup Final during the 1973–74 season at Headingley, Leeds on Saturday 20 October 1973, played , scored 4-conversions and a drop goal in the 15–11 victory over Hull Kingston Rovers in the 1975–76 Yorkshire Cup Final during the 1975–76 season at Headingley, Leeds on Saturday 15 November 1975, played  and captained Leeds in the 16–12 victory over Featherstone Rovers in the 1976–77 Yorkshire Cup Final during the 1976–77 season at Headingley, Leeds on Saturday 16 October 1976, played  (replaced by interchange/substitute Christopher Sanderson) in the 15–6 victory over Halifax in the 1979–80 Yorkshire County Cup Final during the 1979–80 season at Headingley, Leeds on Saturday 27 October 1979, and played  in the 8–7 victory over Hull Kingston Rovers in the 1980–81 Yorkshire Cup Final during the 1980–81 season at Fartown Ground, Huddersfield on Saturday 8 November 1980.

Holmes played , and scored 2-conversions in Leeds' 9–5 victory over St. Helens in the 1970 BBC2 Floodlit Trophy Final during the 1970–71 season at Headingley, Leeds on Tuesday 15 December 1970.

Holmes played , and scored a conversion in Leeds' 12–7 victory over Salford in the 1972–73 Player's No.6 Trophy Final during the 1972–73 season at Fartown Ground, Huddersfield on Saturday 24 March 1973, played  in the 4–15 defeat by Wigan in the 1982–83 John Player Trophy Final during the 1982–83 season at Elland Road, Leeds on Saturday 22 January 1983, played , and scored a try in the 18–10 victory over Widnes in the 1983–84 John Player Special Trophy Final during the 1983–84 season at Central Park, Wigan on Saturday 14 January 1984. 

In 1985, Holmes announced his retirement, but he returned to Headingley a year later.

John Holmes' testimonial match at Leeds took place in 1989.

International honours
Holmes won caps for England while at Leeds in the 1975 Rugby League World Cup against Wales, France, New Zealand, and Australia, in 1977 against Wales, and France (sub), in 1978 against France (sub), and won caps for Great Britain while at Leeds in 1971 against New Zealand, in 1972 against France (2 matches), in the 1972 Rugby League World Cup against Australia (sub), New Zealand and Australia, in the 1977 Rugby League World Cup against France, New Zealand, Australia, and Australia (sub), in 1978 against Australia (sub) (3 matches), in 1979 against Australia (2 matches), Australia (sub), and New Zealand (3 matches), and in 1982 against Australia.

Death and legacy

Holmes died from cancer on 27 September 2009. A minute's silence was observed to mark Holmes' death at the Qualifying Semi-final between Leeds and Catalan Dragons on the 4th of October 2009. On 10 October, Leeds won the Super League Grand Final, captain Kevin Sinfield dedicated the victory to Holmes.

Holmes was inducted into the Leeds Rugby League Hall of Fame as one of the first round of inductees in 2017.

A statue commemorating Holmes was unveiled outside the South Stand at Headingley Rugby League stadium on 11 July 2021.

References

External links
When Great Britain won the World Cup
Tracking down the heroes of 1972
Rugby league mourns legend Holmes
John Holmes RIP

1952 births
2009 deaths
Deaths from cancer in England
England national rugby league team players
English rugby league players
Great Britain national rugby league team players
Leeds Rhinos players
Place of birth missing
Rugby league five-eighths
Rugby league fullbacks
Rugby league players from Leeds
Yorkshire rugby league team players